Vlastimil Pták (November 8, 1925 in Prague – May 5  1999) was a Czech mathematician, who worked in functional analysis, theoretical numerical analysis, and linear algebra.  Notable early work include generalizations of the open mapping theorem .

During 1945–49 Vlastimil Pták studied mathematics and physics at the Charles University in Prague. Later, he worked at the university and since 1952 in Mathematical Institute of Czechoslovak Academy of Sciences. In 1965 he was named professor at the Charles University. He has published more than 160 mathematical research papers. He had three Ph.D. students,  Nicholas Young, Michal Zajac and Miroslav Engliš.

Selected publications
Completeness and the open mapping theorem.  Bull. Soc. Math. France  86  1958 41–74. Text online
On complete topological linear spaces. Czechoslovak Math. J. 3(78), (1953). 301–364.
On matrices with non-positive off-diagonal elements and positive principal minors. (with Miroslav Fiedler) Czechoslovak Math. J. 12 (87) 1962 382–400.

References

External links
 Short obituary
 Short biography (in Czech)
 Overview of Pták's work
 Seventy years of Professor Vlastimil Pták: Biography and interview (PDF or Postscript file, requires subscription)

Czechoslovak  mathematicians
1999 deaths
1925 births
20th-century Czech mathematicians
Charles University alumni
Academic staff of Charles University